Nevadopalpa maculata is a moth in the family Gelechiidae. It was described by Povolný in 1999. It is found in North America, where it has been recorded from California.

References

Nevadopalpa
Moths described in 1999